Rebecca R. Vernon is a United States Air Force major general who serves as the deputy judge advocate general of the United States Air Force. She previously served as the director of military justice and discipline of the United States Air Force Judge Advocate General's Corps. In March 2022, she was nominated for promotion to major general and assigned to serve as the deputy judge advocate general of the Air Force.

References

External links
 

Living people
Year of birth missing (living people)
Place of birth missing (living people)
United States Air Force generals